Colen Ferguson was an American politician who served as the fourth Lieutenant Governor of Delaware, from January 21, 1913, to January 16, 1917, under Governor Charles R. Miller.

External links
Delaware's Lieutenant Governors

Lieutenant Governors of Delaware